Nirwana 04 Nagekeo or Football Club Nirwana 04 Nagekeo is an Indonesian football club based in Nagekeo Regency, East Nusa Tenggara. They currently compete in the Liga 3 and their homeground is Wolosambi Field.

References

External links

Nirwana 04
Nirwana 04
Nirwana 04
Nirwana 04
Nirwana 04